Destiny is the tenth studio album released by the group Celtic Woman.

Background
On 5 August 2015, Celtic Woman announced that a special unnamed free-to-attend-but-ticketed concert performance would be taking place and recorded in the Round Room at the Mansion House in Dublin, Ireland, residence of the Lord Mayor of Dublin since 1715 and where the first Dáil proclaimed the Irish Declaration of Independence in 1919, on 13 August 2015. Due to high demand from audiences based in the United States, the group confirmed on 7 August that the performance would be their next concert special for American broadcaster PBS. The concert began airing on PBS stations across the United States in late 2015 and was released on DVD and Blu-ray in early 2016.

Destiny features vocalists Mairéad Carlin, Susan McFadden, Éabha McMahon and fiddler Máiréad Nesbitt, with vocal director and former member Méav Ní Mhaolchatha and German singer Oonagh as guest performers, and vocalist, harpist and member of Irish choral group Anúna Rebecca Winckworth as an additional guest performer on the PBS special. It is the first album released by the group to feature Carlin and McMahon.

The group toured eighty-five cities in North America in support of the album, which was also nominated for Best World Music Album at the 59th Annual Grammy Awards; the first nomination at the awards for the group.

Track listing

Charts
Destiny opened at No. 1 on the Billboard World Music chart, making it Celtic Woman's ninth consecutive album to debut at No. 1. The album spent sixty-four weeks on the Billboard World Music chart, including a total of eleven weeks at the No. 1 spot. The album remained in the chart's top-ten list for forty-one consecutive weeks and forty-eight weeks in total. The album reached No. 60 on the US Billboard 200 chart.

References

Celtic Woman albums
2015 albums
Manhattan Records albums